George Richards was a professional association footballer who played in the Southern League for Bristol Rovers prior to the First World War.

Richards was originally from Pill, near Bristol, and joined Bristol Rovers in 1911. He scored ten times in 28 league games, playing in both the centre forward and inside left positions during a spell that ended in 1913, and was the club's joint top goalscorer with Billy Peplow in the 1911–12 season.

References

Year of birth missing
Year of death missing
Sportspeople from Somerset
English footballers
Association football forwards
Bristol Rovers F.C. players
Southern Football League players